Vigfússon is a surname of Icelandic origin, meaning son of Vigfús. In Icelandic names, the name is not strictly a surname, but a patronymic. The name refers to:

Guðbrandur Vigfússon (1827–1889), Icelandic scholar
Orri Vigfússon (1942-2017), Icelandic entrepreneur and environmentalist
Ýmir Vigfússon, Icelandic hacker and a computer security expert

Icelandic-language surnames